The 1978 Victorian Football League Night Series was the 18th edition of the VFL Night Series, a VFL-organised national club Australian rules football tournament between the clubs from the VFL and Tasmania.

Qualified Teams

Venues

Knockout stage

Round 1

Quarter-finals

Semi-finals

Victorian Football League Night Series final

References

Australian rules interstate football
History of Australian rules football
Australian rules football competitions in Australia
1978 in Australian rules football